The first Women's Islamic Games was held in Tehran and Rasht, Iran, in 1993. Ten countries were represented at the Games, with 407 athletes, 46 teams, 190 judges, and 2 international observers in attendance.

Participants

Sports

The first edition of the Games featured seven different sport: athletics, badminton, fencing, handball, judo, swimming and volleyball.

Medal table

Women's Islamic Games
Wom
Women's Islamic Games
Multi-sport events in Iran
International sports competitions hosted by Iran
Sport in Tehran
Women's Islamic Games
20th century in Tehran
1993 in women's sport